The 2010–11 season is Levski Sofia's 89th season in the First League. This article shows player statistics and all matches (official and friendly) that the club has played during the 2010–11 season.

Transfers

Summer transfers

In:

Out:

See List of Bulgarian football transfers summer 2010

Winter transfers

In:

Out:

See List of Bulgarian football transfers winter 2010–11.

Squad

As of August 29, 2010

Statistics

Goalscorers

Assists

Cards

Pre-season and friendlies

Summer

Winter

Competitions

A Group

Table

Results summary

Results by round

Fixtures and results

Bulgarian Cup

Second round

Levski advanced to Third round.

Third round

Levski advanced to Quarterfinals.

Quarterfinals

Europa League

Second qualifying round 

Levski advanced to the Third Qualifying round.

Third qualifying round 

Levski advanced to the Playoff round.

Play-off round

Levski advanced to the Group Stage.

Group Stage

Final standings

References

PFC Levski Sofia seasons
Levski Sofia